Pseudothecadactylus cavaticus is a gecko endemic to Australia. The species has an average length from snout to vent of 11.5cm.

References

Pseudothecadactylus
Reptiles described in 1975
Taxa named by Harold Cogger
Geckos of Australia